Filsum is a small municipality in the Leer district, in the North West of Germany.

The municipality lies approximately 30 km from the Netherlands border, and 50 km from where the coast meets the North Sea.

It is home to the 'horse whisperer' and bonesetter, Tamme Hanken.

Mayors 

Gerhard Bruns (CDU) was elected in 2016 honorary mayor of Filsum. He ist the successor of Margret Schulte-Cramer (CDU), she was in office 2011-2016.

References

External links
 German Language site for the municipality
 German Wikipedia

Towns and villages in East Frisia
Leer (district)